The African Cup of Champions Clubs 1981 was the 17th edition of the annual international club football competition held in the CAF region (Africa), the African Cup of Champions Clubs. It determined that years club champion of association football in Africa.

The tournament was played by 31 teams and was used a playoff scheme with home and away matches. JE Tizi Ouzou from Algeria won that final, and became for the first time CAF club champion.

First round

|}
1 
2 
3

Second round

|}
1

Quarter-finals

|}

Semi-finals

|}
1

Final

Champion

Top scorers
The top scorers from the 1981 African Cup of Champions Clubs are as follows:

Notification
JE Tizi Ouzou (Jeunesse Eléctronique de Tizi Ouzou) are now called JS Kabylie (Jeunesse Sportive de Kabylie).

References
1981 African Cup of Champions Clubs - rsssf.com

1
African Cup of Champions Clubs